Astylosternus montanus, also known as the mountain night frog or montane night frog, is a species of frog in the family Arthroleptidae. It is found in the mountains of western Cameroon and into the Obudu Plateau in adjacent south-eastern Nigeria.

Description
Astylosternus montanus has a short, stocky body. The head is slightly longer than it is wide. The legs are strong and relatively short. The dorsum is granular posteriorly and has few to many short dorsolateral ridges. The dorsum varies in colouration: beige, yellow, grey, or chocolate brown, and bears many distinctly delimited black blotches. The ventral parts are dull yellow with darker patterning. Males have a large black nuptial pad on the thumb and dense spines in the throat.

The male advertisement call is a brief and strong "dlouk", "hou", or "rrra".

Habitat and conservation
It can roam to relatively dry areas along forest tracks and in agricultural areas during night. It can tolerate slightly deforestation but always requires canopy cover. It breeds in flowing water. The males call from rock cavities or from in the water.

Astylosternus montanus is a common species, but it probably suffers from some habitat loss and deterioration, despite showing a degree of adaptability. It may locally suffer from harvesting for consumption. It is not known to occur in any protected areas.

References

Astylosternus
Frogs of Africa
Amphibians of Cameroon
Amphibians of West Africa
Fauna of Nigeria
Taxa named by Jean-Louis Amiet
Amphibians described in 1978
Taxonomy articles created by Polbot
Fauna of the Cameroonian Highlands forests